Sheikh T.B Damba is a Ghanaian diplomat and a member of the New Patriotic Party of Ghana. He is currently Ghana's ambassador to The Kingdom Of Saudi Arabia .

Ambassadorial appointment 
In July 2017, President Nana Akuffo-Addo named Sheikh T.B Damba as Ghana's ambassador to Saudi Arabia. He was among twenty two other distinguished Ghanaians who were named to head various diplomatic Ghanaian mission in the world.

References

Year of birth missing (living people)
Living people
Ghanaian Muslims
Ambassadors of Ghana to Saudi Arabia
New Patriotic Party politicians